The 1940 Auburn Tigers football team represented Auburn University in the 1940 college football season. The Tigers' were led by head coach Jack Meagher in his seventh season and finished the season with a record of six wins, four losses and one tie (6–4–1 overall, 3–2–1 in the SEC).

Schedule

References

Auburn
Auburn Tigers football seasons
Auburn Tigers football